David Saunders may refer to:

David Saunders (American football player) (born 1976), American football player
David Saunders (American football coach) (born 1958), assistant football coach at the University of Louisiana-Lafayette
David Saunders (architect) (1928–1986), Australian architect and academic, taught at the Tin Sheds in Sydney in the 1970s
 David Saunders (artist), painter and sculptor, son of illustrator Norman Saunders
David Saunders (economist) (born 1956), Dean of the Smith School of Business from 2003 to 2019
David Saunders (ice hockey) (born 1966), Canadian ice hockey player
David Saunders (political strategist), Democratic political strategist and author
Dave Saunders (volleyball) (born 1960), American former volleyball player
David J. Saunders (1811–1873), Virginia businessman and politician